René Boucher (1 December 1928 – 3 November 2018) was a French rower. He competed in the men's eight event at the 1948 Summer Olympics.

References

1928 births
2018 deaths
French male rowers
Olympic rowers of France
Rowers at the 1948 Summer Olympics
People from Meulan-en-Yvelines
Sportspeople from Yvelines